Stefanini (Stefanini Consultoria e Assessoria em Informática S/A) is a private Brazilian multinational, service and software provider, for data processing and consulting, based in Jaguariúna, São Paulo. 

Stefanini was founded in 1987 by current global CEO Marco Stefanini. The global headquarters is located in Sao Paulo, Brazil, with European headquarters in Brussels, Belgium, and North American headquarters in the Southfield, MI.

References

Brazilian brands
Companies based in São Paulo (state)
Companies established in 1987
Technology companies of Brazil
Privately held companies of Brazil